The 1870 Norwich by-election was fought on 13 July 1870.  The by-election was fought due to the Void election of the incumbent MP of the Conservative Party, Sir Henry Stracey.  It was won by the Liberal candidate Jacob Henry Tillett.

References

Elections in Norwich
By-elections to the Parliament of the United Kingdom in Norfolk constituencies
1870 elections in the United Kingdom
1870 in England
19th century in Norfolk